Greg or Gregory Page may refer to:

 Greg Page (boxer) (1958–2009), American boxer
 Greg Page (musician) (born 1972), Australian musician, formerly with The Wiggles
 Greg Page (album), his self-titled debut album
 Sir Gregory Page, 1st Baronet (c. 1669–1720), British politician and merchant
 Sir Gregory Page, 2nd Baronet (c. 1695–1775), British art collector
 Gregory R. Page (born 1951), American businessman
 Gregory Page (musician) (born 1963), American-Irish songwriter, singer and record producer